Hannah Ertel (born 5 August 1978) is a German judoka. She competed in the women's half-heavyweight event at the 1996 Summer Olympics.

References

External links
 

1978 births
Living people
German female judoka
Olympic judoka of Germany
Judoka at the 1996 Summer Olympics
Sportspeople from Würzburg
20th-century German women